Botafogo Football Club de Douala is a Cameroonian football club. They are a member of the Cameroonian Football Federation and currently play in the top domestic league Elite One.

External links
Soccerway

Football clubs in Cameroon